Bellevue Square is a Canadian novel by Michael Redhill, published by Doubleday Canada in 2017.

Plot
The novel centers on Jean Mason, a bookstore owner in Toronto, Ontario's Kensington Market neighbourhood who learns that she has an apparent doppelgänger named Ingrid Fox in the market's park, Bellevue Square, and becomes obsessed with finding the woman. The two people who have told about her double are soon dead, and Jean decides to camp out in the market to facilitate her search. Her behaviour becomes more and more bizarre.

Critical reception
The novel won the  Scotiabank Giller Prize in 2017. The book was described by the jury members as having "complex literary wonders".

References

External links
 Bellevue Square - Penguin Random House Canada

2017 Canadian novels
Novels by Michael Redhill
Scotiabank Giller Prize-winning works
Kensington Market
Doubleday Canada books